César Augusto Socarraz (June 5, 1910 in Lima, Peru – January 1, 1984 in Lima, Peru) was a Peruvian footballer who played for Universitario de Deportes in Peru, Colo-Colo in Chile, and the Peru national football team in  Copa Américas 1939 and 1941.

Club career
Socarraz played for Universitario de Deportes from 1930 through 1940 and in Chile for Colo-Colo in the period 1941-1943. He scored 33 goals in 69 games for Colo Colo.

National team
Socarraz was included in the Peru national football team for the 1939 Copa América and 1941 Copa América.

Honours
Peruvian Premier Division: 2
 1934, 1939 (Universitario)
Chilean National League: 1
 1941 (Colo-Colo)
Copa América: 1
 1939 (Peru)

References

External links
 Profile - RSSSF (Peru International Players)]
 Profile - Colo Colo 

1910 births
1984 deaths
Footballers from Lima
Association football forwards
Peruvian footballers
Peru international footballers
Club Universitario de Deportes footballers
Colo-Colo footballers
Centro Iqueño footballers
Deportivo Municipal footballers
Peruvian Primera División players
Chilean Primera División players
Peruvian expatriate footballers
Expatriate footballers in Chile
Peruvian expatriate sportspeople in Chile
Copa América-winning players